Marthina Simonne Aguirre Alarcón (born 25 January 2001) is an Ecuadorian footballer who plays as a midfielder for college team South Alabama Jaguars and the Ecuador women's national team.

Early life
Aguirre was born and raised in Denville, New Jersey. Her parents are Ecuadorian.

High school and college career
Aguirre has attended the Isaac Newton Private Educational Unit in Quito and the University of South Alabama in Mobile, Alabama.

Club career
Aguirre has played for Universidad San Francisco de Quito and Dragonas IDV in Ecuador.

International career
Aguirre made her senior debut for Ecuador on 27 November 2020.

References

External links

2001 births
Living people
21st-century American women
People with acquired Ecuadorian citizenship
American people of Ecuadorian descent
Sportspeople of Ecuadorian descent
American women's soccer players
Ecuadorian women's footballers
Ecuador women's international footballers
People from Denville, New Jersey
Soccer players from New Jersey
South Alabama Jaguars women's soccer players
Sportspeople from Morris County, New Jersey
Women's association football wingers